Bowman Island is a high ice-covered island, about  long and from  wide, shaped like a figure eight. Discovered on January 28, 1931, by British Australian and New Zealand Antarctic Research Expedition (BANZARE) under Sir Douglas Mawson, who named it for Isaiah Bowman, then Director of the American Geographical Society.

See also 
 Composite Antarctic Gazetteer
 List of Antarctic islands south of 60° S 
 SCAR
 Territorial claims in Antarctica

Islands of Wilkes Land